Duff is a nickname of:

 Duff Armstrong (1833–1899), American soldier successfully defended by Abraham Lincoln against the charge of murder
 Duff Goldman (born 1974), star of Food Network's reality show Ace of Cakes
 Duff Holbrook (1923–2015), American wildlife biologist, forester and outdoorsman
 John Lowe (musician) (born 1942), English pianist for The Quarrymen, a forerunner of The Beatles
 Duff McKagan (born 1964), bassist of Guns N' Roses and former bassist of Velvet Revolver
 Duff Pattullo (1873–1956), Canadian politician, 22nd premier of British Columbia
 Dufferin Roblin (1917–2010), Canadian businessman and politician

Lists of people by nickname